Tunsberg is the old name of Tønsberg, Norway.
Tunsberg Township in Minnesota is most likely named after the Norwegian town.
 Diocese of Tunsberg is a diocese in Norway